The River Ter is a river in Essex, England that houses various aquatic creatures. The river rises in Stebbing Green and flowing via Terling it joins the Chelmer and Blackwater Navigation at  near Rushes Lock. A small part of it, the River Ter SSSI near Great Leighs, has been a geological Site of Special Scientific Interest since 1994.

See also
Museum of Power - Langford pumping station extracts from the Ter

References

Sites of Special Scientific Interest in Essex
Ter